Phyllanthus fadyenii is a species of plant in the family Phyllanthaceae. It is endemic to Jamaica.

References

fadyenii
Data deficient plants
Endemic flora of Jamaica
Taxonomy articles created by Polbot